"Do It with Madonna" is the debut single by Australian rock band the Androids, released on 28 October 2002 from their self-titled first studio album. The song peaked at number four on the Australian Recording Industry Association (ARIA) charts and was certified platinum by ARIA in 2003. Worldwide, the song reached the top 50 in Ireland, New Zealand, and the United Kingdom.

The Bart Borghesi directed music video won the ARIA Award for Best Video at the ARIA Music Awards of 2003.

Background
The song is a sage comparative study of the shaggability of pop goddesses Christina Aguilera, Pink, Britney Spears and Kylie Minogue are all considered and found wanting in preference for Madonna. Tim Henwood told The Age: "'Do It with Madonna' took me 20 minutes to write. I spent from midnight to 5am demoing it one morning, and now Madonna has actually heard it, it never occurred to me that would happen. It was funny, though, because at the time I remember being careful what I was saying just in case any of them did hear it - 'Don't insult anyone. How would you like it if you were Pink?'" Madonna requested a copy for review and "loves it"."

Track listing
Australian CD single (021212)
 "Do It with Madonna" – 3:49
 "Gone" – 1:55
 "Overdose" – 2:24
 "Inside Out" – 4:10

European CD single (Universal Records 019 973-2)
 "Do It with Madonna" – 3:49
 "Gone" – 1:55

Charts

Weekly charts

Year-end charts

Certifications

Release history

References

External links
 

2002 songs
2002 debut singles
ARIA Award-winning songs
Cultural depictions of Britney Spears
Cultural depictions of Madonna
Festival Records singles
Universal Records singles